Haddon Township is one of nine townships in Sullivan County, Indiana, United States. As of the 2010 census, its population was 3,987 and it contained 834 housing units.

Geography

Cities, towns, villages
 Carlisle

Unincorporated towns
 Paxton at 
(This list is based on USGS data and may include former settlements.)

Adjacent townships
 Hamilton Township (north)
 Cass Township (northeast)
 Jefferson Township (east)
 Widner Township, Knox County (southeast)
 Busseron Township, Knox County (southwest)
 Montgomery Township, Crawford County, Illinois (west)
 Gill Township (northwest)

Cemeteries
The township contains these thirty two cemeteries: Alsman, Arnett, Bethlehem, Benefiel, Booker, Boone, Boyle, Carlisle Old Town, Cartwright, Dooley, Duncan, Engle, Hackett, Haddon, Harper, Independent Order of Odd Fellows, Land, Ledgerwood, Lewis, Loudermilk, McCammon, Mccammon #1, Neil Paxton, Providence, Purcell, Skidmore, Shepard, Snyder, Trimble, Vester, Wilson, and Walters.

Major highway
  U.S. Route 41

School districts
 Southwest School Corporation

Political districts
 Indiana's 8th congressional district
 State House District 45
 State Senate District 39

References
 United States Census Bureau 2008 TIGER/Line Shapefiles
https://www.findagrave.com/cemetery/search?cemetery-name=&cemetery-loc=Sullivan+County%2C+Indiana%2C+United+States+of+America&only-with-cemeteries=cemOnly&locationId=county_868&page=1#cem-84159
 United States Board on Geographic Names (GNIS)
 IndianaMap

External links
 Indiana Township Association
 United Township Association of Indiana

Townships in Sullivan County, Indiana
Terre Haute metropolitan area
Townships in Indiana